The Hoanib is one of the 12 ephemeral seasonal rivers in the west of Namibia, where it was the border between northern Damaraland and Kaokoland. Its length is 270 km. With the low population density, the oasis character of the river valley and the relatively high wildlife population of Hoanib, together with the Hoarusib its valley is one of the last true wilderness areas in Namibia, one of the last settlements of desert elephants and shows strong wind and water eroded and weathered stone deposits (up to 10 m height). Inflows of Hoanib are Aap River, Otjitaimo River, Ombonde, Ganamub, Mudorib and Tsuxub.

Hydrology
It extends from the west coast to Ojiovasando and the Black Peaks of the interior. It also includes the resource-rich region Sesfontein, Warmquelle and the Khowarib Gorge. The highest point of the watershed is at 1800 m. The rainfall in the catchment area is sporadic and vary from 0 mm / yr in the west to 325 mm in the north east of the catchment. The proportion of area with less than 100 mm / yr is 71%. In only 12% of the catchment area is the annual rainfall over 300 mm. The Hoanib flows only every few years from heavy rainfall in the hinterland of the catchment area, but then the flood wave can be several meters high and last for several days. Not always, but more often in recent years, the water reaches the mouth in the Atlantic. A large part of the water seeps into and contributes to a large dense subsurface aquifer, from the exits at various points in the river bed, so that even in dry years there is groundwater. Surrounding groundwater forms efflorescence used by many antelope as salt licks. During dry periods  Hoanib desert elephant foot dig deep holes to reach the near-surface groundwater.

Flora and vegetation
The vegetation of the catchment comprises mainly Mopane savanna (87%) and the northern Namib, at 13%. In the field of gallery forests are found in some larger collections of Ana trees (Faidherbia albida), Leadwood (Combretum imberbe), mopane (Colophospermum mopane), camel thorn (Acacia erioloba) and Salvadora and Euclea. Particularly in the wetlands there are larger, often several meters high stocks of sour grasses and reeds.

With its gallery forests and the larger wetlands in the Khowarib gorge, in a flood area east of Sesfontein and the lower reaches and mouth area, the Hoanib is a linear oasis in the otherwise arid surroundings, providing livelihood for a rich wildlife. In addition to larger populations of many species of antelope found in the lower reaches of the Hoanib, are also a large number of desert elephants (about 35 individuals), rhinos, giraffes and also several lion prides, and smaller predators.

Use and settlement
91% of the catchment area is Communal Land in tribal government. 3% is privately owned land over 12 farms. 6% of the catchment area are in the range of the Skeleton Coast National Park. The population is estimated at around the 9200. Settlement centers are Sesfontein and Warmquelle and Otjivasando. The land use is predominantly pastoral. Individual and adventure tourism is becoming important there. West of Sesfontein, the Hoanib Valley belongs to the concession area of Desert Adventure Safaris. The increasing tourism, but also the grazing pressure of the local population and the greed of mining pose a growing threat to its unique ecosystem.

References

Notes
 Klaus Hüser, Helga Besler, Wolf Dieter Blümel, Klaus Heine, Hartmut Leser, Uwe Rust: Namibia – Eine Landschaftskunde in Bildern. Klaus Hess, Göttingen/Windhoek 2001, 
 Julian Thomas Fennessy: The ecology of desert-dwelling giraffe (Giraffa camelopardalis angolensis) in northwestern Namibia. Diss., Sydney 2004

Rivers of Namibia
Geography of Kunene Region